Rinorea thomensis is a species of plant in the Violaceae family. It is endemic to São Tomé Island.

References

Flora of São Tomé Island
thomensis
Vulnerable plants
Taxonomy articles created by Polbot
Endemic flora of São Tomé and Príncipe